Hon. Geraint Anderson (born 1972 in Notting Hill, London), is a former City of London utilities sector analyst, and newspaper columnist, best known for his City Boy column in thelondonpaper.

Early life
The third son of Labour politician Donald Anderson, Baron Anderson of Swansea and his missionary wife Dorothy, herself the daughter of Bolivian missionaries, he was raised at his parents' London home in Notting Hill. Anderson was educated at Fox School in Notting Hill and Latymer Upper School in Hammersmith. Taking a gap year in Asia, Anderson says he lived the hippy life and smoked dope. He then undertook a degree in history at Queens' College, University of Cambridge, and then an MA in revolutions at Sussex University. Thereafter he went to Goa, India where he eked a living as a hippy selling trinkets on Goa's beaches.

Banking

In 1996, Anderson's older brother Huw who worked as fund manager with Dutch investment bank ABN Amro arranged an interview for him. In a later interview with Al Jazeera, Anderson mused that at that time, he knew nothing about either finance or the City.
Anderson was resultantly employed as a utilities analyst, composing models of publicly listed companies. Within five years, his salary had jumped from £24,000 to £120,000; his first three years of bonuses: £14,000; £55,000 and £140,000. In 1997 he moved to Société Générale, and in 1999 to Commerzbank.

In 2000 Anderson joined Dresdner Kleinwort. He was named top stock-picker two years running, appointed joint team leader of the utilities research team, his team became number two in the utilities sector and Anderson was personally judged the fourth highest-ranked analyst (out of around 100).

City Boy
Anderson started writing his City Boy column in the third quarter of 2006 for thelondonpaper, which became a popular piece with some readers of the newly launched free newspaper.

On 18 June 2008, it was revealed that Anderson was the columnist City Boy of thelondonpaper. The following week he published his first book: Cityboy: Beer And Loathing In The Square Mile.

A second book Cityboy: 50 Ways to Survive the Crunch was published in November 2008. In 2010 Anderson revealed that he was working on a third book, "Just Business". It is about a man who writes an anonymous column for a London-based newspaper, breaks into his boss’s computer and discovers a major crime.

Bibliography

Works by Anderson 
 Geraint Anderson: Cityboy: Beer and Loathing in the Square Mile, Headline Book Publishing, 2008, 
 Geraint Anderson: "Fifty Ways to Survive the Crunch", Headline Book Publishing, 2008, 
 Geraint Anderson: "Just Business", Headline Book Publishing, 2011, 
 Geraint Anderson: "Payback Time", Headline Book Publishing, (Out 21 June 2012),

Filmography 
 Fish Finger Sandwich (short film, 2017): 
 Trick or Treat (feature film with Odeon and Vue cinema release in October 2019 in UK)

References

Interview with Geraint Anderson in Londonlist (http://londonist.com/2010/02/interview_cityboy_scourge_of_the_sq.php)
Interview with Plain English Campaign (http://www.plainenglish.co.uk/press-office/press-release-archive/did-jargon-cause-the-credit-crunch.html)
Interview with The Guardian on a Cityboy's working day (https://www.theguardian.com/business/2009/dec/07/banking-bonuses-executive-pay)

External links
City Boy website
Eyebrow magazine interview
Interview with Radio France Internationale in English
Here is the City News article 
Sky News article
 Times article on Bonuses & Geraint Anderson
 Documentary on Geraint Anderson nominated for an Emmy
 Article in The Sun on bonuses and Geraint Anderson
 https://web.archive.org/web/20111013171125/http://english.aljazeera.net/programmes/meltdown/2011/09/2011917141938887360.html

1972 births
Living people
People from Notting Hill
Alumni of Queens' College, Cambridge
Alumni of the University of Sussex
Welsh columnists
Welsh novelists